Idalion or Idalium (Idalion, Phoenician: 𐤀𐤃𐤉𐤋, Akkadian: Ed-di-al) was an ancient city in Cyprus, in modern Dali, Nicosia District. The city was founded on the copper trade in the 3rd millennium BC. Its name in the 8th century BC was "Ed-di-al" as it appears on the Sargon Stele of 707 BC, and a little later on the Prism of Esarhaddon.

Recent excavations have uncovered major buildings on the site which are open to visitors.
A new museum is in the entrance of the site.

History

The ancient city

The original inhabitants were natives of the island, known to scholars as the "Eteocypriotes". The original city lay on the northern side of the Gialias River in modern "Ayios Sozomenos". During the 13th century BC the people of Ed-di-al began manufacturing operations on the south side of the river in what is now modern Dhali. From there the city grew to the major urban and copper-trading centre founded by the Neo-Assyrians at the end of the 8th century BC.

The city was the centre of the worship of the Great Goddess of Cyprus, the "Wanassa" or Queen of Heaven, known as Aphrodite and her consort the "Master of Animals". This worship appears to have begun in the 11th century BC and continued down through the Roman Period.

The ancient city was located in the fertile Gialias valley and flourished there as an economic centre due to its location close to the mines in the eastern foothills of the Troodos Mountains and its
proximity to the cities and ports on the south and east coast. Idalion prospered and became so wealthy that it was among the 11 cities of Cyprus listed on the Sargon Stele (707 BC) and first among the ten Cypriot kingdoms listed on the prism (many-sided tablet) of the Assyrian king Esarhaddon (680–669 BC).

The city included two acropolises while houses were in the lower city. The fortified palace was built in 750-600 BC on Ampileri Hill, the west acropolis of the city, and rebuilt in 600-475 BC against attacks by Kition. The Temple of Athena was also located there. The east acropolis on Moutti tou Arvili Hill functioned as a sacred centre and included the Temples of Apollo, Aphrodite and of other gods. The lower city was also fortified, at least during the 5th c. BC.

The first evidence of non-Cypriot presence (Greek, Phoenician, and others) appears in the Archaic Period (c. 550 BC) in Phoenician inscriptions found in the Adonis Temenos on the East Acropolis.

Production by the mint dating from 535 BC shows the city's authority and prosperity. The fortified palace was also a sign of this prosperity as it is one of the few, and the largest known, in Cyprus.
The first Kings of Idalion were Greek as shown from coin inscriptions and the important Idalion Tablet. The tablet also shows that the last king, Stakyspros, was democratic in governing by decisions taken with a council of citizens and the resulting documented laws discovered in the temple of Athena. It also shows that there was a social welfare system during the sieges of the city by the Persians and Kitions of 478-470 BC. The king was the biggest landowner and borders of plots were registered.

The city was conquered by Kition, a Phoenician city at that time, in about 450 BC. The palace became their administrative centre; the archive of tax payments was discovered here. Under Kition the city became the centre of a cult of Aphrodite and of the Helleno-Phoenician deity Resheph-Apollo.

From 300 BC the palace and west acropolis were abandoned and the city became centered on the east acropolis, around the special sanctuaries for Aphrodite and Adonis which continued their importance.

The city existed in Hellenistic and Roman times but its extent is not yet known.

"Rosemary scented Idalium" appears in the poetry of Propertius and others as the place where Venus (or Aphrodite, the original pre-Greek Queen of Heaven) met Adonis (the original pre-Greek consort of the Queen of Heaven, or 'Lord').

Cypro-Syllabic script
Cypro-Syllabic script (11th to 2nd century BC) was deciphered based on the Cypriot-Phoenician bilingual text of Idalion which is now in the British Museum's collection. Starting with the Cypriot-Phoenician bilingual text of Idalion (a dedication to the god Reshef Mikal – identified as Apollo Amyklos – 4th century BC), George Smith carried out a first attempt at interpretation in 1871, later developed and improved, thanks also to the Idalion Tablet, by the Egyptologist Samuel Birch (1872), the numismatist Johannes Brandis (1873), the philologists Moritz Schmidt, Wilhelm Deeke, Justus Siegismund (1874) and the dialectologist H.L. Ahrens (1876).

Archaeology

The site is one of the few that was left undisturbed for centuries and therefore is ideal for archaeological investigation.

In the 19th century Luigi Palma di Cesnola, U.S. consul, was brought ancient pots and limestone statuettes by residents of Dhali. He went there and claimed to have “cleared” some 3,000 tombs after which three ships were loaded with antiquities, one of which sank in the Mediterranean, while the others reached New York to help found the Metropolitan Museum of Art.

In 1868 R. Hamilton Lang, the British Consul, found an open-air sanctuary which he called the "Temple of Apollo" containing 142 limestone sculptures, now in the British Museum.

From 1927, the Swedish Cyprus Expedition started its work on the island and did a lot of work at Idalium. On the western acropolis they excavated the remains of a fortification wall. They identified six different building periods. Periods 1–3 were dated to the Late Cypriote III, when the city kingdom of Idalion seems to have been formed. Periods 4–6 were considered to belong from Cypro-Geometric III to Cypro-Archaic II. Based on these assumptions, the earliest settlement on the acropolis could have begun around 1200 BC.

More recent excavations have brought to light much of the fortified palace and other monuments.

The sanctuary of Adonis (Apollo) has produced many statues and objects which are now in museums.

The Idalion Tablet is a 5th-century BC bronze tablet found here and inscribed on both sides. The script of the tablet is in the Cypriot syllabary and the inscription itself is in Greek. The tablet records a contract between "the king and the city" and mentions a reward given to a family of physicians for providing free health services to casualties during the siege of Idalion by the Persians.

North of Idalium is the Nymphaeum of Kafizin, with Cypro-syllabic inscriptions dated to 225–218 BC.

See also
Idalion Tablet
List of ancient Greek cities

Notes

References
2008: P. Gaber "The History of History: Excavations at Idalion and the Changing History of a City-Kingdom" NEA Vol.71, Nos. 1&2, pp. 51–63; L. Stager, A. Walker, American Expedition to Idalion Cyprus 1973–1980, Oriental Institute Press, Chicago 1989; 1974: L.Stager, A. Walker, and G.E. Wright, eds. American Expedition to Idalion: First Preliminary Reports: Seasons of 1971 and 1972. ASOR, Cambridge, MA.

External links

 

Cities in ancient Cyprus
Phoenician colonies in Cyprus
Former populated places in Cyprus